Brass Knuckles is a surviving 1927 silent crime film directed by Lloyd Bacon and starring Monte Blue, Betty Bronson and William Russell. It was produced and distributed by Warner Brothers Pictures.

Cast
Monte Blue - Zac Harrison
Betty Bronson - June Curry
William Russell - 'Brass Knuckles' Lamont
George E. Stone - Velvet Smith(*Georgie Stone)
Paul Panzer - Sergeant Peters
Jack Curtis - Murphy

See also
List of early Warner Bros. sound and talking features

Preservation status
This film survives, like several late Warner Brothers and First National silents, in the Italian archive Cineteca Italiana, Milan.  Its trailer is held in the Library of Congress collection.

References

External links
 Brass Knuckles at IMDb.com

1927 films
American silent feature films
Films directed by Lloyd Bacon
Warner Bros. films
American black-and-white films
American crime films
1927 crime films
1920s American films